Three ships and a shore establishment of the Royal Navy have borne the name HMS Attack:

Ships
 was a 12-gun  launched in 1794 and sold in 1802.
 was a  launched in 1804 and captured by Danish gunboats off Anholt in 1812.
 was an  launched in 1911 and sunk in 1917.

Shore establishments
 was a Coastal Forces base at Portland, commissioned in 1941 and paid off in 1945.

See also

Royal Navy ship names